Michel François Hidalgo (22 March 1933 – 26 March 2020) was a French professional footballer and manager. He was the head coach of the France national team from 1976 to 1984, with whom he won the UEFA Euro 1984 on home soil, also reaching the semi-finals of the 1982 FIFA World Cup.

Early life
Michel François Hidalgo was born on 22 March 1933 in Leffrinckoucke, Nord. He was born to a Spanish-born father and a French mother in northern France, and grew up in Normandy, where he started playing football. He was named after Mexican patriot Miguel Hidalgo y Costilla.

Club career
A midfielder, Hidalgo was champion of Normandie Juniors in 1952 with US Normande, before signing up tp Le Havre's books for two seasons, later playing for Reims, with whom he played and scored a goal in the 4–3 defeat to Real Madrid in the 1956 European Cup Final, also winning a league title in 1955.

Under the wing of Rocher, who signed him for Monaco, Hidalgo won two league titles and two national cup titles with Monaco. Between 1964 and 1970, he presided over the UNFP, a players' syndicate.

International career
At international level, Hidalgo was capped once for the France national team in 1962 in a friendly match against Italy.

Managerial career
Hidalgo started managing the Monaco second team in 1967 and served as a player-manager with Menton from 1968 until 1969.

On 27 March 1976, he was appointed France national team head coach, replacing Ștefan Kovács – under whom he had previously served as an assistant – during a time when France was having difficulty in major tournaments. Included in his side was playmaker and captain Michel Platini, who helped the side turn a new page in their book and get back to winning ways. After suffering a first-round elimination at the 1978 FIFA World Cup, in the 1982 FIFA World Cup Hidalgo led the team to the semi-finals, where he lost to the West German side on penalties following a 3–3 draw after extra-time; France eventually finished the tournament in fourth place. In 1984, he won the European Championship on home soil, beating Spain 2–0 in the final in Paris; this was France's first major international title. The exciting attacking style of football that he implemented with the France national side during this period was known as "champagne football" in the media. Hidalgo is also regarded as the architect of the French "carré magique" (magic square), which was nickname given to the creative and talented four-man midfield of the France national side during the 80s, which was made up of Michel Platini, Alain Giresse, Jean Tigana, and Luis Fernandez.

After his victory, he passed the reins over to his assistant Henri Michel and got a job as the National Technical Director, where he remained until 1986, afterwards choosing a managerial position at Marseille. He is considered an idol among the Marseille supporters. He strayed from the limelight after 1991, taking a sidelining role as a football pundit on Demain, c'est foot, a football show on TMC Monte Carlo.

Death
Hidalgo died on 26 March 2020 in Marseille, at the age of 87, after a lengthy struggle with a disease.

Honours

Player
Reims
Division 1: 1954–55
Trophée des Champions: 1955
European Cup runner-up: 1955–56

Monaco
Division 1: 1960–61, 1962–63
Coupe de France: 1959–60, 1962–63
Trophée des Champions: 1961

Manager
France
UEFA European Championship: 1984

Individual
French Manager of the Year: 1982
European Coach of the Year—Sepp Herberger Award: 1984
World Soccer World Manager of the Year: 1984
Guerin Sportivo Manager of the Year: 1984

References

External links

 
 

1933 births
2020 deaths
Sportspeople from Nord (French department)
French footballers
France international footballers
Association football midfielders
Le Havre AC players
Stade de Reims players
AS Monaco FC players
Ligue 1 players
French football managers
France national football team managers
Congo national football team managers
1978 FIFA World Cup managers
1982 FIFA World Cup managers
UEFA Euro 1984 managers
UEFA European Championship-winning managers
Expatriate football managers in the Republic of the Congo
French expatriate sportspeople in the Republic of the Congo
French people of Spanish descent
Footballers from Hauts-de-France
Footballers from Normandy